Telendos, is a Greek island in the southeastern Aegean Sea, belonging to the Dodecanese. It was a member of the Delian League.

The island is approximately semi-circular in shape, consisting of a single, steep, flat-top mountain whose sides plunge directly into the sea.  The only flat land is at the southern tip of the island, which is where the only settlement is located. There are no cars on the island, and in 2001 the population stood at 54.  Telendos was joined to Kalymnos, becoming separated from it in the 6th century AD following a series of earthquakes.

References

Islands of Greece
Dodecanese
Landforms of Kalymnos (regional unit)
Islands of the South Aegean
Members of the Delian League
Climbing areas of Greece